The Siloam Historic District, in Siloam, Georgia, is a  historic district which was listed on the National Register of Historic Places in 2001.  The listing included 40 contributing buildings, a contributing structure, and a contributing site.

The district is a very irregular area roughly centered on Main St. (Georgia Route 15), Union Point Highway (Georgia Route 77), and Church St., within the city's essentially circular area.

Among other properties, it includes the Siloam city cemetery, the Siloam Baptist Church, and the Siloam Presbyterian Church

References

Historic districts on the National Register of Historic Places in Georgia (U.S. state)
National Register of Historic Places in Greene County, Georgia
Italianate architecture in Georgia (U.S. state)
Queen Anne architecture in Georgia (U.S. state)
Buildings and structures completed in 1878